Shekari may refer to:

 Rans S-16 Shekari, light aircraft
 Ishaya Shekari, a Nigerian military governor
 Reza Shekari, Iranian footballer
Shekari, Afghanistan